John Gabriel may refer to:

 John Gabriel (basketball), executive in the National Basketball Association
 John Gabriel (actor) (1931–2021), American actor
 John Gabriel, a character in the webcomic Penny Arcade